Galathea balssi is a species of squat lobster found throughout the tropical waters of the central Indo-Pacific.

References

Crustaceans described in 1964
Squat lobsters